Gedare is a village in the southern state of Karnataka, India. It is located in the Gauribidanur taluk of Chikkaballapura district in Karnataka. It is situated 12 km away from sub-district headquarter Gauribidanur and 43 km away from district headquarter Chikkaballapura.

Demographics
According to Census 2011 information the location code or village code of Gedare village is 623229.  Gedare village is also a gram panchayat. Villages comes under Gedare gram Panchayat are Singanahalli, Narasimhanahalli, Kondapura, Kenkere, Kachamachenahalli, Gedare and Dimmagattanahalli.

The total geographical area of village is 348.29 hectares. Gedare has a total population of 1,637 peoples with 819 males and 818 females. There are about 402 houses in Gedare village. Gauribidanur is nearest town to Gedare which is approximately 12 km away.

Economy
People belonging to the Gedare village grow maize and millet silk. The major occupations of the residents of Gedare are sericulture and dairy farming. The dairy cooperative is the largest individual milk supplier cooperative in the state.

Facilities
The facilities in Gedare include:

 Government higher primary School
 Gedare KMF (Karnataka Milk Federation) Dairy
 Government Grocery store
 Gedare Gram Panchayat Office
 Preliminary Government Hospital

Temples
 Hanuman Temple
 Shiva Temple
 Chowdeshwari Temple
 Gaalamma Temple and
 Basava Temple

Tourist Attractions
 Gadare hills caves

See also
Doddakurugodu

References

External links
 https://chikkaballapur.nic.in/en/

Villages in Chikkaballapur district